Joy Bangla is a slogan and war cry used in Bangladesh to indicate nationalism towards the geopolitical, cultural and historical region of Bengal and Bangamata (also known as Bangla Maa or Mother Bengal). It is also recognised as the national slogan of Bangladesh. It translates roughly to "Victory to Bengal" or "Hail Bengal".

History

Purnachandra Das, an Indian schoolteacher and revolutionary from Madaripur, Bangladesh was imprisoned in the Berhampur Jail for his involvement in the independence movement. Bengali Kazi Nazrul Islam composed the poem 'Purna-Abhinandan' from the book of poems 'Bhangar Gaan' at the request of Kalipada Roychowdhury on the occasion of the release of Purnachandra Das from prison. Kazi Nazrul Islam first used the word Joy Bangla in this poem. The name of the slogan Joy Bangla comes from this poem named "Pūrṇa Abhinandan" (1922) by Kazi Nazrul Islam. The middle two lines of the fifth stanza are as follows:

In Bengalī script
জয় বাংলার পূর্ণচন্দ্র, জয় জয় আদি-অন্তরীণ!
জয় যুগে-যুগে-আসা-সেনাপতি, জয় প্রাণ আদি-অন্তহীন!
Transliteration
Joy Bangla'r pūrṇochondro, joy joy adi ontorīṇ
joy jugē jugē asa sēnapoti, joy prāṇ ontohīn
English Translation
Hail to bengal's Purnachandra, hail to the eternally enveloped,
All hail to the warriors who came here generation after generation, hail to the ceaseless eternal souls.

It appeared in the 11-point charter put forth by the Sarbadaliya Chhatra Sangram Parishad on 4 January 1969. After the release of Sheikh Mujibur Rahman, the SCSP held a rally at the Ramna Race Course ground on 22 February 1969, to honour him. When Mujib was conferred the title of Bangabandhu, cries of Joy Bangla came from all over the park.

Joy Bangla was the slogan and war cry of the Mukti Bahini that fought for the independence of Bangladesh during the Bangladesh Liberation War in 1971.  In Bangladesh Liberation War, 27 March 1971 Major Ziaur Rahman broadcast announcement of the declaration of independence on behalf of Sheikh Mujibur Rahman and he finished with "Joy Bangla".

After the assassination of Sheikh Mujibur Rahman, Khondakar Mostaq Ahmad replaced Joy Bangla with Bangladesh Zindabad.

National slogan of Bangladesh 

The High Court on 4 December 2017 directed the government of Bangladesh to explain "why 'Joy Bangla' would not be declared as national slogan of the county.'"

On 10 March 2020, The High Court made the declaration naming "Joy Bangla" as the official national slogan of Bangladesh.

Justice FRM Nazmul Ahasan and Justice KM Kamrul Kader announced this after settling a rule on a writ petition filed two years ago.
The High Court also added that this order will be done fulfill within next three months.

Bangladesh constitutional office-holders and all state officials will be use on all national days and in appropriate cases, at the end of their speeches in state programmes. All of educational  institution teachers and students must be use the Joy Bangla motto at the end of assemblies.
On 20 February 2022 the cabinet division has decided to make Joy Bangla as the national slogan. On 2 March 2022 The government has issued a notification declaring 'Joy Bangla' as the national slogan of Bangladesh. According to the notification:

1.(a) ' Joy Bangla ' will be the national slogan of Bangladesh.

(b) Officials of all government offices should chant the slogan 'Joy Bangla' at the end of all national day celebrations and other functions of the state and the government.

(c) Teachers and students should say the slogan 'Joy Bangla' at the end of daily gatherings and for concluding speeches at meetings and seminars in all educational institutions.

Political slogan

In Bangladesh
The salutation "Joy Bangla" is the official slogan of the Bangladesh Awami League. The phrase "Joy Bangla, Joy Bangabandhu" is used by the party members at the end of speeches and communications pertaining to or referring to patriotism towards Bangladesh and Bangabandhu Sheikh Mujib.

In West Bengal
The slogan Joy Bangla is also officially used by Mamata Banerjee and by her party Trinamool Congress as part of attempt to create a territorial and ethnolinguistic identity for Bengalis in India. It is used in particular, as a closing remark for political speeches.

In West Bengal in January 2018, for the first time in India, Bengali national organization "Bangla Pokkho" raised the slogan Joy Bangla.

In popular culture
On 7 March 1971 Sheikh Mujibur Rahman called for independence and asked the people of Bangladesh to launch a major campaign of civil disobedience and organized armed resistance at a mass gathering of people held at the Race Course Ground in Dhaka.

The struggle now is the struggle for our emancipation; the struggle now is the struggle for our independence. Joy Bangla!..(For more info, see: 7th March Speech of Sheikh Mujibur Rahman)

The surrender ceremony of the Pakistani military also took place at the Race Course Ground on 16 December 1971. About 93,000 Pakistani troops surrendered, making it the largest military surrender that occurred after World War 2. Lieutenant General Jagjit Singh Aurora, Joint Commander of Indian and Bangladesh Forces accepted the surrender without a word, while the crowd on the race course erupted in celebrations, shouting victory slogans, "Joy Bangla".

The phrase has also given its name to
 Joy Bangla weekly (1971), one of the two official mouthpieces of the provisional Mujibnagar government, that led the Bangladesh's independence war.
 Joy Bangla Banglar Joy, a patriotic and popular song. It was the signature tune of the Swadhin Bangla Betar Kendra.
 Joy Bangla Concert, annual benefit concert by Young Bangla.
 Joy Bangla Youth Award, the flagship Award event of Young Bangla.

See also 
 Bangladesh Liberation War
 Bangladesh Zindabad
 Bengali nationalism
 Pakistan Zindabad

References 

Battle cries
Bangladesh Liberation War
Bengali words and phrases
Bangladeshi political slogans